Stella Helen Gilmore (1900 – October 8, 1947) was an American stage actress, composer, lyricist and magazine editor from Chicago, Illinois.

Stock company player
Gilmore came to New York City in 1917 and studied for a time at Columbia University. On November 22, 1920, she made her acting debut in When We Are Young with Henry Hull. She appeared with the stock company of George Cukor in Providence, Rhode Island. On tour she acted in support of Bette Davis, William Hodge, Spencer Tracy, and other stars.

Magazine editor
Gilmore left the theater in 1933. She became affiliated with Liberty. In 1938 she was appointed editor of Movie Mirror Magazine, a Macfadden publication. She became editor of Photoplay in 1941 after the periodical merged with Movie Mirror. Her career as an editor lasted approximately a decade.

Gilmore died of acute leukemia at Mt. Sinai Hospital, New York in 1947. She was 47 years old.

Theatre performances

Compositions
Except where otherwise noted, all words and music by Stella Helen Gilmore.           
 "Honolulu"
 "Syncopated Lullabye"
 "Wy-ree-woo"
 "Swing Me" 
 "Inconsistency" 
 "Examination Blues"
 "Spanish Infanta"
 "Cause It's You" (w - Sidney Levy)
 "The Gift"
 "I Want to Say"
 "When I Come Riding Home"
 "Where Syringa Trees Blow"
 "Ye Who Have Lifted Your Hearts"
 "My Crossword Puzzle Girl" (as Helen Gilmore; w – Cecil Owen)

References

Further reading

Articles
 "Social Notes; Arrivals". New Ocean House Reminder. July 23. 1914 . p. 19
 Price, Theo H. (October 31, 1917). "Editorial Incidence and Reflection". Commerce and Finance. No. 44. p. 1103
 "Five O'Clock Tidbits". The Spur. February 1, 1918. p. 32
 Dudley, Bide (December 4, 1920). "About Plays and Players: Gossip". The New York Evening World. Comic Page.
 Muray, Nikolas (June 1920) "Players Who Captivate Broadway: Helen Gilmore". Theatre Magazine. p. 363
 Gilmore, Stella Helen (January 1922). "To Europe: Something new, Something true; Something to make you happy, too". Vanity Fair. p.  16
 "Daily Graphic Review of News Events: On Complaint of his wife...". The Bridgeport Times and Evening Farmer. August 12, 1922.
 "Transfer Actress's Suit". The New York Times. February 16, 1923. p. 13
 "News Notes". Modern Hospital. Vol. XXII, No. 3. March 1924. p. 308
 "'Buffs' Sister-in-Law; 'The Show-Off' Amusing Comedy'". The San Francisco Examiner. July 20, 1926. p. 12
 Muir, James (May 22, 1927). "Sparkling Brunette Beauty of Wright Players Wants to Live With the Indians". Dayton Daily News. p. 22.
 "Is Ready Favorite With Patrons of the Victory Theater". The Dayton Daily News. June 12, 1927. p. 22
 Gilmore, Helen (December 1941). "Exclusive! The Real Reason Stirling Hayden Quit Hollywood" [sic]. Photoplay. pp. 30 – 31, 76 
 Gilmore, Helen (November 1943). "Bette Davis Faces Sorrow". Photoplay. pp. 69 – 70, 72, 74
 Kerr, Adelaide (February 23, 1944). "Editor Likes Movies, With Good Reason: Helen Gilmore". Eau Clare Leader-Telegram. p. 4
 "Inside Stuff". Photoplay. July 1947. p. 22
 "117 Equity Members Died Last Year". Variety. June 16, 1942. p. 53

Books
 Library of Congress (1922). Catalog of Copyright Entries: Musical compositions, Part 3; List of Copyright Renewals; List of Notices of User. Washington Government Printing Office. p.
 New York City Board of Estimate and Apportionment (1923). Minutes of the Board of Estimate and Apportionment of the City of New York. p. 476
 Muir, Peter C. (2004). Before "Crazy Blues": Commercial Blues in America, 1850–1950. New York, NY : City University of New York. . 

American stage actresses
American magazine editors
American women composers
Actresses from Chicago
1900 births
1947 deaths
Deaths from acute leukemia
Deaths from cancer in New York (state)
20th-century American actresses
American Presbyterians
Columbia University alumni
20th-century American non-fiction writers
Women magazine editors